Lisandro Duque Naranjo (born 30 October 1943) is a Colombian film director and screenwriter. He has directed ten films since 1974. His 1983 film The Bicycle Racer was entered into the 13th Moscow International Film Festival. His 2001 film, The Invisible Children, was selected as the Colombian entry for the Best Foreign Language Film at the 75th Academy Awards, but it was not nominated.

Selected filmography
 The Bicycle Racer (1983)
Visa U.S.A (1986)
 Milagro en Roma (1988)
Los niños invisibles (2001)
Los actores del conflicto (2008)
El Soborno del Cielo (2016)

References

External links

1943 births
Living people
Colombian film directors
Colombian screenwriters
Male screenwriters
People from Valle del Cauca Department